The HAN University of Applied Sciences, mostly referred to as HAN, is one of the largest universities of applied sciences in the Netherlands. It offers bachelor's and master's degree programs to over 36,000 students. HAN is a knowledge institute for higher education in the Dutch province of Gelderland, with campuses in Arnhem and Nijmegen and a research center in Doetinchem.

History 
In the 1980s there were many small universities of applied sciences in the Netherlands. The government at the time believed this was inefficient, both in terms of the financing and organizing of education. In 1983 the government pushed smaller universities of applied sciences to merge. The Netherlands Association of Universities of Applied Sciences agreed, and gradually more and more universities of applied sciences in Arnhem and Nijmegen merged.

On 1 February 1996, the HAN conglomerate was finally established and it became a large, broad-based educational institution. Since then the number of students has grown while costs have been reduced, entirely in line with the goals of the government and the Association of Universities of Applied Sciences.

In June 2019, HAN changed its name. Formerly known under its Dutch name Hogeschool van Arnhem en Nijmegen, it now bears the name HAN University of Applied Sciences. In the process, HAN also changed its logo and corporate identity.

Organization
Thera are 14 HAN schools:

 School of Built Environment
 School of Business and Communication
 School of Education
 School of Engineering and Automotive
 School of Finance
 School of Health Studies
 School of IT and Media Design
 School of Social Studies
 School of Organisation and Development
 School of Allied Health
 School of Law
 International School of Business
 School of Sport and Exercise
 School of Applied Biosciences and Chemistry

The degree programs, research and consultancy are organized by these schools. All supporting services are incorporated in the Services Department, divided over seven Service Units.

Management Layers 
The organization has three management layers:

 The university of applied sciences under management of the Executive Board
 The schools under management of the Executive Board / the Services Department under the management of a director
 The degree programs under management of the schools / the Service Units under management of a head

Participation 
HAN has a structurer in place for staff and student participation and representation in decision-making. This involves:

 A central participation council. This council is a member of the Intercity Student Consultation and the Dutch Association of Participation Councils for Universities of Applied Sciences.
 Fourteen school councils and one Services Department council.  These councils also receive support from the Student Consultation on Participation.
 Degree committees for each of the degree programs. The degree committee deals with the operational policy of a degree program and supports the program manager in this.
 The class representatives form the basis for the participation structure.

In 2010-2011, HAN decided not to split the participation council up into a separate student council and a works council, and so instead of following the Works Councils Act they adhere to the Higher Education and Research Act (Wet op Hoger en Wetenschappelijk Onderwijs). At the same time, however, it was decided that each employee participation body may determine its own rules of procedure about whether the student and employee sections within that council convene separately or jointly.

Degree programs 
HAN offers bachelor, master and post-graduate programs and courses for professional in various fields, such as economics, management, education, health, ICT and technology.

Bachelor programs 
The school offers around 64 bachelor programs in the following fields:

 Business, Management and Law
 Engineering and Life Sciences
 Information Technology, Media and Communication
 Education and Training
 Behavior and Social Studies
 Health
 Sport and Exercise
There are also 9 English-taught bachelor programs for international students:

 Automotive Engineering
 Chemistry
 Communication
 Electrical and Electronic Engineering
 Embedded Systems Engineering
 International Business
 International Social Work
 Life Sciences
 Mechanical Engineering

Master programs and research

Master programs 
HAN offers 18 master programs in the following fields:

 Business, Management and Law
 Engineering and Life Sciences
 Information Technology, Media and Communication
 Education and Training
 Behavior and Social Studies
 Health

Research 
HAN supports companies and institutions with innovation through its research groups in various fields. They conduct research on issues from professional practice and they develop practical solutions together with the work field. This includes:

 Research groups and knowledge networks (50 research groups)
 PhD research

Post-graduate degrees, professional courses and consultancy service 
HAN offers over 150 practice-based post-graduate programs and courses for professionals. It also offers internships, projects and graduation assignments.

Masterclasses 
Three times a year HAN also organizes Creative Masterclasses. These are lectures, masterclasses and seminars with international speakers on the theme of economy and creativity.

See also
 Radboud University Nijmegen

References

External links

 Official website
Han University Scholarships
Tuition Fees



Vocational universities in the Netherlands
Educational institutions established in 1996
1996 establishments in the Netherlands
Organisations based in Gelderland
Buildings and structures in Arnhem
Education in Arnhem
Buildings and structures in Nijmegen
Education in Nijmegen